A Famous Gentleman (Spanish:Un caballero famoso) is a 1943 Spanish drama film directed by José Buchs and starring Amparo Rivelles and Alfredo Mayo. The film is set in the world of bullfighting.

Plot 
When well-bred Rafael meets beautiful but inconstant Eugenia he is fascinated to the point of even becoming a torero to please her wish for fame.

Cast
 Amparo Rivelles 
 Alfredo Mayo 
 Tomás Blanco   
 Florencia Bécquer
 Manolo Caracol    
 Antonio Casas   
 Juan Cortés 
 Roberto Lampaya   
 Joaquina Maroto  
 Manolita Morán   
 Miguel Pozanco  
 Alberto Romea   
 Jacinto San Emeterio

References

Bibliography
 Bentley, Bernard. A Companion to Spanish Cinema. Boydell & Brewer 2008.

External links 

1943 films
Spanish drama films
1943 drama films
1940s Spanish-language films
Films directed by José Buchs
Spanish black-and-white films
1940s Spanish films